Carciofi alla Romana , literally "Roman-style artichokes", is a typical dish of Roman cuisine. During spring-time in Rome, the dish is prepared in each household and is served in all restaurants. It represents one of the most famous artichoke dishes of the Roman cuisine, another being Carciofi alla giudia, a deep-fried artichoke dish that originated in the Jewish community of Rome.

Preparation

In Rome and surroundings this dish is prepared with artichokes of the Romanesco variety, harvested between February and April in the coastal region northwest of Rome, between Ladispoli and Civitavecchia.

The artichokes are cleaned with a sharp knife, eliminating all of the hard leaves and the thorns using an upward spiral movement. Only a couple of cm of the stem are left; the rest is cleaned, cut into pieces and cooked with the artichokes. The artichokes are plunged for some minutes into water with lemon juice, so that they do not turn brown. Then they are opened in the center and the choke (present only toward the end of the growing season) is removed. Into the resulting cavity of each artichoke is stuffed a mixture of parsley, lesser calamint (in Rome called mentuccia), and garlic, with salt and pepper to taste. After this preparation, all of the artichokes are put into a deep pan, standing on their stems, enough in number so that they support each other and don't fall over. Water and olive oil (a variant uses also white wine) are added. Oil and salt and pepper to taste are sprinkled on them. Then the pan is covered and they are braised until the liquid has evaporated. One may eat them warm or at room temperature.

See also 
Roman cuisine
Carciofi alla giudia

References

Sources 

Cuisine of Lazio